Adil Bhatti (born October 28, 1984) is an American cricketer. He played in the 2014 ICC World Cricket League Division Three tournament. In January 2018, he was named in the United States squad for the 2017–18 Regional Super50 tournament in the West Indies. He made his List A debut for the United States in the 2017–18 Regional Super50 on 31 January 2018. In June 2021, he was selected to take part in the Minor League Cricket tournament in the United States following the players' draft. On October 7, 2022, Adil was seen picking fights with youth soccer coaches at Oak Marr. He was also swearing and verbally attacking parents of 7 year old boys who were requesting that he stop swearing and stop running across the Oak Marr field where 7 year olds were learning to play soccer. Police were called by the coaches and parents to stop Adil from potentially causing harm to kids.

References

External links
 

1984 births
Living people
American cricketers
21st-century American people